Attar Singh Saini is a cinematographer based in Mumbai, India. He has been working in the Indian film industry in Mumbai  for the last twenty one years. His lighting is lyrical and every composition tells a tale of emotions. Saini has graduated from Film & TV Institute of India, Pune in 1992, which is one of premier film schools of Asia.

Career
He started his career as assistant cameraman in the a feature film called Kabhi Haan Kabhi Naa and his own 1st feature film as a cinematographer is 7½ Phere.

Films
Saini’s film releases include:

Commercials for the industry's biggest brands:
 Taj Hotel Palace series 
 Binani Cement
 Indo farm tractors
 Surf Excel
 Pepsodent
 Whisper
 Clinic All Clear
 Hyundai Santro
 Sun Feast Biscuit
 Britannia biscuit
 XXX condoms
 Godrej Shaving Cream
 Vicks vaporizer
 Rexona Deo
 Sagem mobile
 Hair care oil

Feature film Chocolate has earned critical acclaim for its cinematography, few quote from critics are as follow. Saini has also been a member for the jury for the Indian Television Academy Awards 2009.

Awards and distinction
Critics reviews of the feature film Chocolate. "Fantastically served by the cameraman Attar Singh Saini (take a bow Please)" - Khalid Mohamed, DNA, dated 18/09/05
Film has a crisp look throughout courtesy cinematographer (Attar Singh Saini) - Indiagalitz
Cinematography (Attar Singh Saini) is splendid. The ˜winter look" of London has been captured with Elan. Film bears rich look throughout - Taran Adarsh, 16th Sep.2005, India FM
Attar Singh Saini has managed to give a true international look throughout the movie with his cinematography exploited - Vikash Mohan, Movie talkies.com
The visual brilliance (cinematography) Attar Singh Saini - Whyte Space & The Hindu Madras
Attar Singh Saini is marvelous - Chkarshift King, Sktees
The film score in one area... the look, it has an ultra modern feel - Nikhat Kazmi, Times of India, Dated 18/09/05
Jury Member for ITA awards 2004 & 2009
Indian Television Academy, Best Cinematography Award, 2003 for Television Series : Kashmeer. Producer : Contiloe Films for Star Plus.

References

External links

 http://attarsinghsaini.com/

Cinematographers from Maharashtra
Living people
Year of birth missing (living people)